Mary Allen (born 1951) is a British writer, broadcaster, arts administrator and management consultant.

Mary Allen or Allan may also refer to:
Mary Allen Wilkes (born 1937), former computer programmer and hardware engineer
Mary Sophia Allen (1878–1964), Welsh-born suffragette who was an early police woman and a far right leader
Mary Aileen Allen (1888–1950), American diver who competed in the 1920 Summer Olympics
Mary Love (1943–2013), born (sources differ) as Mary Ann Allen, American singer
Mary Cecil Allen (1893–1962), Australian artist, writer and lecturer
Mary Cecelia Allen, writer and writing coach
Mary Allan (academic) (1869–1956), British academic, principal of Homerton College, Cambridge
Mary Parsons Reid Allan (1917–2002), Scottish artist
Mary Electa Allen (1858–1941), American photographer 
Mary Elyse Allan (born 1950s), Canadian businesswoman